Ilıcak is a village in the Beytüşşebap District of Şırnak Province in Turkey. The village is populated by Kurds of the Kaşuran tribe and had a population of 438 in 2021.

References 

Villages in Beytüşşebap District
Kurdish settlements in Şırnak Province